Mount Dora High School is a high school located in Mount Dora, Florida. It serves grades 9 to 12. The total enrollment of the high school is 1,228.

Expansion

In 1960, the former Roseborough Elementary School building became part of Mount Dora High School.

Athletics
The Hurricanes are the name of the athletic teams from the high school.  Luke Hutchinson is the current coach of the football team.
Dan Spear was the winningest football coach in Mount Dora High School's history.

Mount Dora Hurricanes won 20 games in a row from 1950 to 1952 and won Central Florida Conference titles in all three years. In 1959 they won the conference title again.

Vocations

Mount Dora High School's Air Force JROTC unit has won the Silver Star Community Service award multiple times, most recently in 2021.

Mount Dora High School's band performed at a least a few Mount Dora Day events when the events were still held.

Select history

In January 2018, a student at Mount Dora High School threatened to shoot people and he was subsequently arrested and charged for the incident.

Notable alumni and faculty-coaches

Fred Tyler -  won a gold medal in the 1972 Summer Olympics in the 4×200-meter freestyle relay, he was the swimming coach at Mount Dora High School in the late 1980s 
Jason Boltus - former professional football player,  he was the quarterbacks coach at Mount Dora High School in 2014

References

High schools in Florida
Mount Dora, Florida
High schools in Lake County, Florida
Educational institutions established in 1922
1922 establishments in Florida